The Lone Star Distinguished Service Medal, also known as the Texas Distinguished Service Medal, is the fifth highest military decoration that can be conferred to a service member of the Texas Military Forces. Subsequent decorations are conferred by a white enameled five-pointed star trimmed in gold device.

Eligibility
The Lone Star Distinguished Service Medal is conferred to any service member of the Texas Military Forces who, while serving in any capacity with the Texas Military Forces, shall have distinguished themselves by exceptionally outstanding achievement or service to the State of Texas in the performance of duties of great responsibility. The Adjutant General has final approval authority.

Authority
The Lone Star Distinguished Service Medal was authorized by the Sixtieth Texas Legislature in House Bill Number 674 and approved by the Governor John Connally on 8 May 1967, effective the same date.

Description

Medal 
The medal pendant is a brushed gold five-pointed star with one point up, 1-1/2 of an inch in circumscribing diameter. In the raised center of the star is the inscription "SERVICE" on a royal blue field, encircled by a live oak branch with acorns on the wearer's right and an olive branch with olives on the wearer's left. The star is suspended by one link from a brushed gold bar, 1-3/8 of an inch long and 9/32 of an inch high, bearing the inscription "TEXAS" in raised brushed gold letters on a field of royal blue. The reverse of the medal pendant and bar is blank. The pendant is suspended by a metal loop attached to a burnt red moiré silk neckband 1-3/8 of an inch wide and 24 inches long, behind a hexagonal pad in the center made of matching ribbon. A white enameled five pointed star, trimmed in gold and 3/8 of an inch in circumscribing diameter, is centered on the hexagonal pad, one point up.

Device 
A white enameled five-pointed star, trimmed in gold, 3/8th of an inch in circumscribing diameter, is conferred for second and successive decorations. Stars will be worn centered on the ribbon, with one point up, in conjunction with the star that is part of the original decoration. A maximum of four stars, to include the star that is part of the original decoration, will be worn.

Recipients

See also 

 Awards and decorations of the Texas Military
 Awards and decorations of the Texas government

 Texas Military Forces
 Texas Military Department
 List of conflicts involving the Texas Military

External links

 Texas Distinguished Service Medal

References
11. Texas Military Forces, Joint Force HQ permanent order 191-02

12. Texas Military Forces, Joint Force HQ permanent order 084-001
Awards and decorations of the Texas Military Forces
Texas Military Forces
Texas Military Department